Philippe Labro (born 27 August 1936) is a French author, journalist and film director.  He has worked for RTL, Paris Match, TF1 and Antenne 2.  He is a laureate of the Prix Interallié, a French literary distinction founded in 1930, which was awarded for «L'Étudiant étranger» in 1986.

At the age of eighteen, he left France to study at Washington and Lee University in Virginia. He then travelled across the United States. On his return to Europe, he became a reporter. From 1960 to 1962, during the Algerian war, Labro was a member of the military. He then returned to his journalistic activities. While covering the assassination of John F. Kennedy for French newspaper France-Soir, he met Jack Ruby in Dallas days before he shot and killed Lee Harvey Oswald; he was thus subsequently officially auditioned by the Warren Commission.
He has written and directed many films and was a close friend of Jean-Pierre Melville, as he recalls in the 2008 documentary Code Name Melville. From 1985 to 2000, he was director of programmes at RTL becoming the vice president of the station in 1992.

In April 2010, he became Commander of the Légion d'honneur.

Selected filmography
 Sans mobile apparent (Without Apparent Motive) - with Jean-Louis Trintignant (1971)
 L'Héritier - with Jean-Paul Belmondo (1973)
 Le hasard et la violence (Chance and Violence) - with Yves Montand and Katharine Ross (1974)
 L'Alpagueur (The Hunter Will Get You) - with Jean-Paul Belmondo (1976)
  (Cover Up) - with Claude Brasseur, Jean-Louis Trintignant and Jean-Claude Brialy (1983)
 Rive droite, rive gauche - with Gérard Depardieu, Nathalie Baye and Carole Bouquet (1984)

References

External links
 

1936 births
Living people
People from Montauban
20th-century French journalists
21st-century French journalists
French autobiographers
French film directors
French television executives
French television presenters
Commandeurs of the Légion d'honneur
Prix Interallié winners
Washington and Lee University alumni
Paris Match writers